Minority Rights Group International (MRG) is an international human rights organisation founded with the objective of working to secure rights for ethnic, national, religious, linguistic minorities and indigenous peoples around the world. Their headquarters are in London, with offices in Budapest and Kampala. MRG has an international governing Council that meets twice a year. MRG has consultative status with the United Nations Economic and Social Council (ECOSOC) and observer status with the African Commission on Human and Peoples' Rights.

The organisation was set up in 1969 by a group of activists and academics in order "to protect the rights of minorities to co-exist with majorities, by objective study and consistent international public exposure of violations of fundamental rights as defined by the UN Charter".

Its first director was David Astor, editor and proprietor of The Observer newspaper at the time.

See also

Genocide
Global Human Rights Defence
Minority group
Minority rights
List of human rights organisations

References

Barzilai, Gad. Communities and Law: Politics and Cultures of Legal Identities (Ann Arbor: University of Michigan Press, 2003).

External links
Minority Rights Group International - Official website
Online Directory of the World’s Minorities and Indigenous Peoples
Peoples Under Threat
Covering Migration

Organizations established in 1969
International human rights organizations
International organisations based in the United Kingdom
Minority rights